Back to the L.A.B (Lyrical Ass Beating) is an EP by KRS-One.

Track listing 
 Who Da Best
 Omni-Hood
 WOLF!
 Show Shocked
 Never Afraid
 TEK-NOLOGY

Sample credits 
"WOLF!" contains a laugh sample from the instrumental song called Pre-Dawn Dub by Mikey Dread. The same laugh sample is also included in the Sega arcade video game Streets of Rage 2 which is used for one of the characters you fight against called Big Ben.

References 

2010 EPs
KRS-One albums